Innis & Gunn is a beer brand based in Edinburgh, Scotland. It was founded in 2003 by Master Brewer Dougal Gunn Sharp.

Innis & Gunn has contract brewed in Glasgow at Tennent's Wellpark Brewery since 2014  and has been exported to over 35 countries. It is the No.1 "craft" lager in Scotland, the No.1 imported "craft" beer in Canada and the No.3 in Sweden. In 2017, Innis & Gunn sold 2.5M cases of beer in over 35 countries. The Innis & Gunn Brewery in Perth is the brand's home for innovation and barrel-ageing.

The first Innis & Gunn Brewery Taproom opened in Edinburgh in the summer of 2015, winning the UK Casual Dining Concept Award in 2016.

With a focus on craft beer and food paints, it later expanded to Dundee and Glasgow's Ashton Lane, the largest unit opened to date.

In late 2016, to help grow the company, Innis & Gunn raised £2.4M in a crowdfund, surpassing its target of £1M in 72 hours.

In 2017, Innis & Gunn signed a distribution deal in China for its flagship ale 'The Original'.

Varieties

Regular availability
 Original - This is the brewery's flagship beer. It is aged using bourbon casks and over bourbon-infused heartwood in specialty "Oakerators" It is 6.6% alcohol by volume. At first only available as a bottled beer, it is now marketed in bottles, cans and as draught.
 Blood Red Sky - A replacement to the old Rum Cask beer, Blood Red Sky is aged using Jamaican rum barrels and is a part of the core range offered by Innis & Gunn. This red beer is 6.8% ABV and is available in bottled and as draught.
  IPA - This India Pale Ale is 5.6% ABV and is available in cans, bottles and as draught. 
 Lager Beer - Innis & Gunn Lager Beer is a craft-brewed lager, 4.6% ABV. Available in cans, bottles and as draught.

See also
 Barrel-aged beer

References

Breweries in Scotland
Companies based in Edinburgh
British companies established in 2003
2003 establishments in Scotland
British brands
Food and drink companies established in 2003